The defense industry of Serbia is the largest in the Western Balkans. For the 2018 calendar year, Serbia's export of weapons and military equipment was valued at $897 million (€796 million). It consists of around 200 companies, both public and private, working in many different fields.
Serbian defense companies closely cooperate with the Military Technical Institute, country's top-level military scientific research institution, in developing new weapons, as well as with Serbian Armed Forces' Technical Testing Center, using its services for testing of new defense products. Universities and colleges in Serbia also participate through various contracts with the companies.

Legal framework

All Serbian manufacturers of defense equipment must abide to national Law on manufacturing and sale of weapons and defense equipment. There is a special permission for manufacturing defense material and manufacturers must meet many criteria in order to get a permit for manufacturing. There is also a special registry that all companies have to apply to in order to obtain permits for import or export defense products; as of 2018, 219 companies were registered for arms import-export.

Education
There are several universities that have proper defense industry study programs, such as:
 Faculty of Mechanical Engineering, University of Belgrade
 Department for Military Engineering
 Department for Aerospace
 Faculty of Engineering, University of Kragujevac
 Department for Military Industrial Engineering
 Military Academy of University of Defence

Manufacturers
Production is performed in many companies, both public (state-owned) and private. There is a close cooperation between some of these in numerous projects.

Public

Public companies i.e. those that are state-owned are grouped into "Defence Industry of Serbia" holding.

Private
Partial list of private companies includes:
 EDePro - rockets, ammunition, UAV, seekers for IR guided missiles, engines for rockets and UAV
 Iritel - electronics, radars
 Tigar - NBC protection, tank and vehicle parts
 Proizvodnja Mile Dragić - uniforms, shoes, boots, personal protections etc. 
 NB Inat - pistols, rifles and guns
 SovaNVision - electronics and optics 
 Senzor Infiz - electronics, battery chargers, laser designations, ballistic computers 
 Imtel komunikacije - portable radars, radar detectors, electronics 
 PPT-TMO - mechanical parts for rifles, tanks, rockets
 Pneumatik flex - hydraulics for self propelled artillery and other vehicles 
 Pneumo logic - acclimatization and ventilation systems for self propelled artillery and other vehicles
 Poliester - tubes for MANPADS
 VLATACOM - security systems, radars 
 Ei-OPEK - ammunition fuzzes, multiple rocket launchers controllers and electronics 
 FTN-IRAM-RT - radar spare parts, electronics for radar data acquisition and radar controllers 
 Tehnoremont - combat vehicles overhaul 
 Azimuth-DPS - combat vehicles overhaul, tank overhaul, T-55 modernization, combat wheeled vehicles production

Fairs
Every two years international defense fair "Partner" is organized in Belgrade. Defense companies of Serbia participate at fair presenting its latest products.

References

Sources

 
 

 
Manufacturing companies of Serbia
Serbia
Industry in Serbia
Military of Serbia
Defense companies of Serbia